Woodcreek is a city in Hays County, Texas, United States. Like its neighbor of Wimberley, Woodcreek is a primarily a retirement community. The population was 1,457 at the 2010 census.

Geography

Woodcreek is located in western Hays County at  (30.027623, –98.113382).

Cypress Creek, a tributary of the Blanco River, forms the western boundary of the city.

Demographics

As of the census of 2000, there were 1,274 people, 588 households, and 415 families residing in the city. The population density was 1,204.7 people per square mile (464.1/km). There were 638 housing units at an average density of 603.3/sq mi (232.4/km). The racial makeup of the city was 97.65% White, 0.16% African American, 0.24% Native American, 0.24% Asian, 0.47% from other races, and 1.26% from two or more races. Hispanic or Latino of any race were 1.96% of the population.

There were 588 households, out of which 19.7% had children under the age of 18 living with them, 64.8% were married couples living together, 4.6% had a female householder with no husband present, and 29.3% were non-families. 26.5% of all households were made up of individuals, and 16.2% had someone living alone who was 65 years of age or older. The average household size was 2.17 and the average family size was 2.58.

In the city, the population was spread out, with 16.7% under the age of 18, 3.1% from 18 to 24, 16.9% from 25 to 44, 30.3% from 45 to 64, and 33.0% who were 65 years of age or older. The median age was 55 years. For every 100 females, there were 81.5 males. For every 100 females age 18 and over, there were 79.2 males.

The median income for a household in the city was $52,986, and the median income for a family was $60,703. Males had a median income of $50,893 versus $29,500 for females. The per capita income for the city was $32,893. About 1.5% of families and 2.5% of the population were below the poverty line, including 1.3% of those under age 18 and 1.8% of those age 65 or over.

Education
Woodcreek is served by the Wimberley Independent School District.

References

External links
City of Woodcreek official website

Cities in Hays County, Texas
Cities in Texas
Cities in Greater Austin